Leadership in Energy and Environmental Design (LEED) is a green building certification program used worldwide. Developed by the non-profit U.S. Green Building Council (USGBC), it includes a set of rating systems for the design, construction, operation, and maintenance of green buildings, homes, and neighborhoods, which aims to help building owners and operators be environmentally responsible and use resources efficiently. 

By 2015, there were over 80,000 LEED-certified buildings and over 100,000 LEED-accredited professionals. Most LEED-certified buildings are located in major U.S. metropolises. LEED Canada has developed a separate rating system adapted to the Canadian climate and regulations. Some U.S. federal agencies, state and local governments require or reward LEED certification. This can include tax credits, zoning allowances, reduced fees, and expedited permitting. Studies have found that for-rent LEED office spaces generally have higher rents and occupancy rates and lower capitalization rates.

LEED is a design tool rather than a performance-measurement tool and focuses on energy modeling rather than actual energy consumption. It lacks climate specificity, and has been criticized for a point system that can encourage inappropriate design choices and make energy conservation the weakest part of the evaluation. It has also been criticized for the phenomenon of "LEED brain" in which the public relations value of LEED certification drives the development of buildings.

History

Development of the Leadership in Energy and Environmental Design (LEED) certification program began in 1993, spearheaded by Natural Resources Defense Council (NRDC) senior scientist Robert K. Watson and supported by the U.S. Green Building Council (USGBC). Among the contributors to the initial guidelines were J. D. Polk, co-founder of Solar Cells, Inc. (now First Solar), and solar-power advocate Lawton Chiles, the Governor of Florida at the time. Watson led a broad-based consensus process for two decades, bringing together non-profit organizations, government agencies, architects, engineers, developers, builders, product manufacturers and other industry leaders. 

The USGBC Board of Directors was chaired by Steven Winter from 1999 to 2003. At that time, USGBC's Senior Vice President of LEED, Scot Horst, became chair of the LEED Steering Committee before joining USGBC staff. Early LEED committee members also included USGBC co-founder Mike Italiano, architects Bill Reed and Sandy Mendler, builders Gerard Heiber and Myron Kibbe, and engineer Richard Bourne. As interest in LEED grew, engineers Tom Paladino and Lynn Barker co-chaired the LEED technical committee, formed .

From 1994 to 2015, LEED grew from one standard for new construction to a comprehensive system of interrelated standards covering aspects from the design and construction to the maintenance and operation of buildings. LEED also grew from six committee volunteers to an organization of 119,924 staff, volunteers and professionals. 
 LEED standards have been applied to approximately 83,452 registered and certified LEED projects worldwide, covering around 13.8 billion square feet (1.28 billion square meters).

Many U.S. federal agencies, states, and local governments require or reward LEED certification.  the leading four states, based on certified square feet per capita were Illinois, Washington, Massachusetts, and Colorado.
However,  lumber, chemical and plastics trade groups have lobbied to weaken the application of LEED guidelines in several southern states. In 2013, the states of Alabama, Georgia and Mississippi effectively banned the use of LEED in new public buildings, in favor of other industry standards that the USGBC considers too lax.

Unlike model building codes, such as the International Building Code, only members of the USGBC and specific "in-house" committees may add to, subtract from, or edit the standard, subject to an internal review process. Proposals to modify the LEED standards are offered and publicly reviewed by USGBC's member organizations, which number almost 6660.

USGBC's Green Business Certification Inc. (GBCI) offers various accreditations to people who demonstrate knowledge of the LEED rating system, including LEED Accredited Professional (LEED AP), LEED Green Associate, and LEED Fellow. GBCI also certifies projects pursuing LEED.

Rating systems
LEED has evolved since 1998 to more accurately represent and incorporate emerging green building technologies. The pilot version, LEED New Construction (NC) v1.0, led to LEED NCv2.0, LEED NCv2.2 in 2005, LEED 2009 ( LEED v3) in 2009, and LEED v4 in November 2013. LEED 2009 was depreciated for new projects registered from October 31, 2016.
LEED v4.1 was released on April 2, 2019.

LEED also forms the basis for other sustainability rating systems such as the U.S. Environmental Protection Agency's (EPA) Labs21 and LEED Canada.  The Australian Green Star is based on both LEED and the UK's Building Research Establishment Environmental Assessment Methodology (BREEAM).

LEED v3 (2009)
LEED 2009 encompasses ten rating systems for the design, construction and operation of buildings, homes and neighborhoods. Five overarching categories correspond to the specialties available under the LEED professional program. That suite consists of:  

Green building design and construction (BD+C) – for new construction, core and shell, schools, retail spaces (new constructions and major renovations), and healthcare facilities
Green interior design and construction – for commercial and retail interiors
Green building operations and maintenance
Green neighborhood development
Green home design and construction

LEED v3 aligned credits across all LEED rating systems, weighted by environmental priority. It reflects a continuous development process, with a revised third-party certification program and online resources.

Under LEED 2009, an evaluated project scores points to a possible maximum of 100 across six categories:  sustainable sites, water efficiency, energy and atmosphere, materials and resources, indoor environment quality (IEQ) and design innovation. Each of these categories also includes mandatory requirements, which receive no points. Up to 10 additional points may be earned: 4 for regional priority credits and 6 for innovation in design. Additional performance categories for residences (LEED for Homes) recognize the importance of transportation access, open space, and outdoor physical activity outdoors, and the need for buildings and settlements to educate occupants.

Buildings can qualify for four levels of certification:
Certified: 40–49 points 
Silver: 50–59 points
Gold: 60–79 points
Platinum: 80 points and above

The aim of LEED 2009 is to allocate points "based on the potential environmental impacts and human benefits of each credit". These are weighed using the environmental impact categories of the EPA's Tools for the Reduction and Assessment of Chemical and Other Environmental Impacts (TRACI) and the environmental-impact weighting scheme developed by the National Institute of Standards and Technology (NIST).

Prior to LEED 2009 evaluation and certification, a building must comply with environmental laws and regulations, occupancy scenarios, building permanence and pre-rating completion, site boundaries and area-to-site ratios. Its owner must share data on the building's energy and water use for five years after occupancy (for new construction) or date of certification (for existing buildings).

The credit weighting process has the following steps: First, a collection of reference buildings are assessed to estimate the environmental impacts of similar buildings. NIST weightings are then applied to judge the relative importance of these impacts in each category.  Data regarding actual impacts on environmental and human health are then used to assign points to individual categories and measures. This system results in a weighted average for each rating scheme based upon actual impacts and the relative importance of those impacts to human health and environmental quality.

The LEED council also appears to have assigned credit and measured weighting based upon the market implications of point allocation.

From 2010, buildings can use carbon offsets to achieve green power credits for LEED-NC (new construction certification).

LEED v4 (2014)

For LEED BD+C v4 credit, the IEQ category addresses thermal, visual, and acoustic comfort as well as indoor air quality. Laboratory and field research have directly linked occupants' satisfaction and performance to the building's thermal conditions. Energy reduction goals can be supported while improving thermal satisfaction. For example, providing occupants control over the thermostat or operable windows allows for comfort across a wider range of temperatures.

LEED v4.1 (2019)
On April 2, 2019, the USGBC released LEED v4.1, a new version of the LEED green building program, designed for use with cities, communities and homes.

LEED Canada
In 2003, the Canada Green Building Council (CAGBC) received permission to create LEED Canada-NC v1.0, which was based upon LEED-NC 2.0. As of 2021, Canada ranked second in the world (not including the USA) in its number of LEED-certified projects and square feet of space.  Buildings in Canada such as Winnipeg's Canadian Museum for Human Rights are LEED certified due to practices including the use of rainwater harvesting, green roofs, and natural lighting.

As of March 18, 2022, the Canada Green Building Council took over direct oversight for  LEED™ green building certification of projects in Canada, formerly done by GBCI Canada. CAGBC will continue to work with Green Business Certification Inc. (GBCI) and USGBC while consolidating certification and credentialing for CAGBC's Zero Carbon Building Standards, LEED, TRUE, and Investor Ready Energy Efficiency (IREE).

Certification process
LEED certification is granted by the Green Building Certification Institute (GBCI), which arranges third-party verification of a project's compliance with the LEED requirements. The certification process for design teams consists of the design application, under the purview of the architect and the engineer and documented in the official construction drawings, and the construction application, under the purview of the building contractor and documented during the construction and commissioning of the building.

A fee is required to register the building, and to submit the design and construction applications.  Total fees are assessed based on building area, ranging from a minimum of $2,900 to over $1 million for a large project. "Soft" costs – i.e., added costs to the building project to qualify for LEED certification – may range from 1% to 6% of the total project cost. The average cost increase was about 2%, or an extra $3–$5 per square foot.

The application review and certification process is conducted through LEED Online, USGBC's web-based service.  The GBCI also utilizes LEED Online to conduct their reviews.

LEED energy modeling
Applicants have the option of achieving credit points by building energy models.  One model represents the building as designed, and a second model represents a baseline building in the same location, with the same geometry and occupancy.  Depending on location (climate) and building size, the standard provides requirements for heating, ventilation and air-conditioning (HVAC) system type, and wall and window definitions.  This allows for a comparison with emphasis on factors that heavily influence energy consumption.  The number of points achieved in this credit is proportional to the predicted energy savings.

This method has been criticized for inaccurately predicting actual energy usage. The USGBC admits that "current information indicates that most buildings do not perform as well as design metrics indicate. As a result, building owners might not obtain the benefits promised."

LEED for Homes rating system
The process of the LEED for Homes rating system, available in the U.S., Canada and Sweden, differs significantly from the LEED NC rating system. LEED for Homes projects are low-rise residential and are required to work with either an American or a Canadian provider organization and a green rater. The provider organization helps the project through the process while overseeing the green raters, individuals who conduct two mandatory site inspections: the thermal bypass inspection and the final inspection. Although LEED for Homes is typically viewed by the construction industry as a simpler rating system than LEED NC, the latter does not require an on-site inspection. The provider and rater assist in the certification process but do not themselves certify the project.

Performance
Research papers provide most of what is known about the performance and effectiveness of LEED in two credit category areas: energy and indoor environment quality (IEQ).  In one study of 953 New York City office buildings, 21 LEED certified buildings collectively showed no energy savings compared with non-LEED buildings, although LEED Gold buildings "outperformed other NYC office buildings by 20%".  IEQ-related studies provide two contrasting results: the first used occupant survey results in 65 LEED buildings and 79 non-LEED buildings and concluded that occupants of both groups had equal satisfaction with the building overall and with the workspace. The second IEQ study used occupant interviews and physical site measurements at 12 LEED buildings to report superior indoor environment performance compared with 12 similar non-certified buildings.

Buildings certified under LEED do not have to prove energy or water efficiency in practice to receive LEED certification points, but instead LEED uses modeling software to predict future energy use based on intended use. This has led to criticism of LEED's ability to accurately determine the efficiency of buildings. The USGBC has noted that "Buildings have a poor track record for performing as predicted during design."

Energy performance research
In 2009, architectural scientist Guy Newsham (et al.) of the National Research Council of Canada (NRC) analyzed a database of 100 LEED certified (v3 or earlier version) buildings.  In this study, each building was paired with a conventional "twin" building within the Commercial Building Energy Consumption Survey (CBECS) database according to building type and occupancy.  On average, LEED buildings consumed 18 to 39% less energy by floor area than the conventional buildings, although 28 to 35% of LEED-certified buildings used more energy.  The paper found no correlation between the number of energy points achieved or LEED certification level and measured building performance.

In 2009 physicist John Scofield published an article in response to Newsham et al., analyzing the same database of LEED buildings and arriving at different conclusions.  Scofield criticized the earlier analysis for focusing on energy per floor area instead of a total energy consumption. Scofield considered source energy (accounting for energy losses during generation and transmission) as well as site energy, and used area-weighted energy use intensities (EUIs) (energy per unit area per year), when comparing buildings to account for the fact that larger buildings tend to have larger EUIs.  Scofield concluded that, collectively, the LEED-certified buildings showed no significant source energy consumption savings or greenhouse gas emission reductions when compared to non-LEED buildings, although they did consume 10–17% less site energy.

In 2013 Scofield analyzed 21 LEED-certified buildings in New York City. He found that LEED-Gold buildings used 20% less source energy while Silver and Certified buildings used 11 to 15% more source energy, on average, than did their conventional counterparts.

In 2014, architect Gwen Fuertes and engineer Stefano Schiavon developed the first study that analyzes plug loads using LEED-documented data from certified projects. The study compared plug load assumptions made by 92 energy modeling practitioners against ASHRAE and Title 24 requirements, and the evaluation of the plug load calculation methodology used by 660 LEED-CI and 429 LEED-NC certified projects. They found that energy modelers only considered the energy consumption of predictable plug loads, such as refrigerators, computers and monitors. Overall the results suggested a disconnection between assumptions in the models and the actual performance of buildings.

Energy modeling might be a source of error during the LEED design phase. Engineers Christopher Stoppel and Fernanda Leite evaluated the predicted and actual energy consumption of two twin buildings using the energy model during the LEED design phase and the utility meter data after one year of occupancy. The study's results suggest that mechanical systems turnover and occupancy assumptions significantly differ from predicted to actual values.

Most of the current analysis of LEED buildings focuses on LEED v3 (2009) or earlier versions rather than LEED v4 (2014) certification. According to Newsham et al., these analyses should be considered as preliminary and should be repeated with longer data history and larger building samples, including new LEED v4 certified buildings. Newsham et al. also noted that further work needs to be done to define green-building rating schemes to ensure more consistent and substantial long-term reduction of energy consumption at the individual building level.

IEQ performance research
The Centers for Disease Control and Prevention (CDC) defines indoor environmental quality (IEQ) as "the quality of a building's environment in relation to the health and wellbeing of those who occupy space within it."  The USGBC includes the following considerations for attaining IEQ credits: indoor air quality, the level of volatile organic compounds (VOC), lighting, thermal comfort, and daylighting and views.  In consideration of a building's indoor environmental quality, published studies have also included factors such as: acoustics, building cleanliness and maintenance, colors and textures, workstation size, ceiling height, window access and shading, surface finishes, furniture adaptability and comfort.

In 2013, a paper published by Schiavon and architectural physicist Sergio Altamonte studied occupant IEQ satisfaction in LEED and non-LEED buildings.  Using occupant surveys from the Center for the Built Environment at Berkeley database, 65 LEED-certified and 79 non-LEED buildings were analyzed for 15 IEQ-related factors. These factors include the ease of interaction, building cleanliness, the comfort of furnishing, the amount of light, building maintenance, colors and textures, workplace cleanliness, the amount of space, furniture adjustability, visual comfort, air quality, visual privacy, noise, temperature, and sound privacy. The results showed occupants tend to be slightly more satisfied in LEED buildings for the air quality and slightly more dissatisfied with the amount of light. The overall finding was that there was no significant influence of LEED certification on occupant satisfaction in consideration of the overall building and workspace ratings.  The paper noted that the data may not be representative of the entire building stock and a randomized approach was not used in the data assessment.

Based on similar dataset (21,477 occupants) in 2013, Schiavon and Altomonte found that occupants have equivalent satisfaction levels in LEED and non-LEED buildings when evaluated independently from the following factors: office type, spatial layout, distance from windows, building size, gender, age, type of work, time at workspace, and weekly working hours. LEED certified buildings may provide higher satisfaction in open spaces than in enclosed offices, in smaller buildings than in larger buildings, and to occupants having spent less than one year in their workspaces rather than to those who have used their workspace longer. The study also notes that the positive value of LEED certification from the aspect of occupant satisfaction may tend to decrease with time.

In 2015, a study on indoor environmental quality and the potential health benefits of green-certified buildings was developed by environmental health scientist Joseph Allen (et al.) showing that green buildings provide better indoor environmental quality with direct benefits to human health of occupants of those buildings in comparison to non-green buildings. One of the limitations of the study was the use of subjective health performance indicators since there is a lack of definition on such indicators by current studies.

Newsham et al. published a detailed study on IEQ and LEED buildings in August 2013.  Field studies and post-occupancy evaluations (POE) were performed in 12 green and 12 conventional buildings across Canada and the northern United States. On-site, 974 workstations were measured for thermal conditions, air quality, acoustics, lighting, workstation size, ceiling height, window access and shading, and surface finishes.  Responses were positive in the areas of environmental satisfaction, satisfaction with thermal conditions, satisfaction with outside views, aesthetic appearance, reduced disturbance from HVAC noise, workplace image, night-time sleep quality, mood, physical symptoms, and reduced number of airborne particulates. The results showed green buildings exhibited superior performance compared with similar conventional buildings.

A 2017 study by Altomonte, Schiavon, et al. investigated whether a green rating itself leads to higher occupant satisfaction with IEQ. Based on the analysis of a subset of the CBE Occupant IEQ including 11,243 responses from 93 LEED-certified office buildings, this study found that the achievement of a specific IEQ credit did not substantially increase the satisfaction with the corresponding IEQ factor. In addition, the rating level and version of the certification had no impact on workplace satisfaction. There are some possible explanations. Many intervening factors in the time between design and occupancy can alter the existence or performance of the strategies that LEED awarded. IEQ certification metrics also face the challenges from substantial differences that characterize the modern workplace in terms of spatial needs, task requirements, users' characteristics, and disciplines of product design and marketing. Survey participants may also misinterpret the satisfaction with an IEQ parameter, or bias with personal attitudes.

The daylight credit was updated in LEED v4 to include a simulation option for daylight analysis that uses spatial daylight autonomy (SDA) and annual sunlight exposure (ASE) metrics to evaluate daylight quality in LEED projects. SDA is a metric that measures the annual sufficiency of daylight levels in interior spaces and ASE describes the potential for visual discomfort by direct sunlight and glare. These metrics are approved by the Illuminating Engineering Society of North America (IES) and codified in the LM-83-12 standard. LEED recommends a minimum of 300 lux for at least 50% of total occupied hours of the year for at least 55% of the occupied floor area. The threshold recommended by LEED for ASE is that no more than 10% of regularly occupied floor area can be exposed to more than 1000 lux of direct sunlight for more than 250 hours per year. Additionally, LEED requires window shades to be closed when more than 2% of a space is subject to direct sunlight above 1000 lux. According to building scientist Christopher Reinhart, the direct sunlight requirement is a very stringent approach that can discourage good daylight design. Reinhart proposed the application of the direct sunlight criterion only in spaces that require stringent control of sunlight (e.g. desks, white boards, etc.).

Innovation in design research
Innovation in LEED architecture is linked with new designs and high-quality construction. One example is use of nanoparticle technology for consolidation and conservation effects in cultural heritage buildings. This practice began with the use of calcium hydroxide nano-particles in porous structures to improve mechanical strength. Titanium, silica, and aluminum-based compounds may also be used.

Material technology and construction techniques could be among first issues to consider in building design. For the facade of high-rise buildings, such as the Empire State Building, the surface area provides opportunities for design innovation. New York City has five other high rise green buildings; Bank of America Building (One Bryant Park), Hearst Building, One World Trade Center, The New York Times Building and Condé Nast Building. VOC released from construction materials into the air is another challenge to address.

In Milan, a university-corporate partnership sought to produce semi-transparent solar panels to take the place of ordinary windows in glass-facade high-rise buildings. Similar concepts are under development elsewhere, with considerable market potential.  

The Manzara Adalar skyscraper project in Istanbul, designed by Zaha Hadid, saw considerable innovation as part of the Urban Transformation Project of the Kartal port region.

Extreme structures that have received LEED certification include: Amorepacific Headquarters in Seoul by David Chipperfield Architects; Project: Brave New World: SFMOMA by Snøhetta in San Francisco, California; Project: UFO in a Sequinned Dress: Centro Botín in Santander by Renzo Piano; Building Workshop in Zusammenarbeit with Luis Vidal + Architects, in Santander, Spain; and Project: Vertical factory: Office building in London by Allford Hall Monaghan Morris in London.

Other related research notes
A 2003 analysis of the savings from green building found in a review of 60 LEED buildings that these buildings were, on average, 25–30% more energy efficient. It also attributed substantial benefits to the increased productivity from the better ventilation, temperature control, lighting control, and reduced indoor air pollution.

From a financial perspective, several 2008 studies found that LEED for-rent office spaces generally charged higher rent and had higher occupancy rates. Analysis of CoStar Group property data estimated the extra cost for the minimum benefit at 3%, with an additional 2.5% for silver-certified buildings. More recent studies have confirmed these earlier findings in that certified buildings achieve significantly higher rents, sale prices and occupancy rates as well as lower capitalization rates, potentially reflecting lower investment risk.

LEED focuses on the design of the building and not on its actual energy consumption, and therefore it has been suggested that LEED buildings should be tracked to discover whether the potential energy savings from the design are being used in practice.

Directories of LEED-certified projects
The USGBC and Canada Green Building Council maintain online directories of U.S. LEED-certified and LEED Canada-certified projects. In 2012 the USGBC launched the Green Building Information Gateway (GBIG) to connect green building efforts and projects worldwide. It provides searchable access to a database of activities, buildings, places and collections of green building-related information from many sources and programs, including LEED projects.

Professional accreditation
The Green Building Certification Institute (GBCI) describes its LEED professional accreditation as "demonstrat[ing] current knowledge of green building technologies, best practices" and the LEED rating system, to assure the holder's competency as one of "the most qualified, educated, and influential green building professionals in the marketplace." Credentials include the LEED Green Associate and the various types of specialized LEED Accredited Professionals (AP).

Benefits and disadvantages

LEED-certified buildings are intended to use resources more efficiently when compared to conventional structures inspected only to mandatory building codes. However, analysis of energy and water use data from New York City shows that LEED certification does not necessarily make a building more energy or water efficient.

Often, when a LEED rating is pursued, the cost of initial design and construction rises. There may be a lack of abundant availability of manufactured building components that meet LEED specifications. There are also added costs in USGBC correspondence, LEED design-aide consultants, and the hiring of the required Commissioning Authority, which are not in themselves necessary for an environmentally responsible project.

Proponents argue that these higher initial costs can be mitigated by the savings incurred over time due to projected lower-than-industry-standard operational costs typical of a LEED certified building. This life cycle costing is a method for assessing the total cost of ownership, taking into account all costs of acquiring, owning and operating, and the eventual disposal of a building.  Additional economic payback may come in the form of employee productivity gains incurred as a result of working in a healthier environment. Studies suggest that an initial up-front investment of 2% extra yields over ten times that initial investment over the life cycle of the building.

The USGBC has stated support for Architecture 2030, an effort that has set a goal for a building to operate with no greenhouse-gas-emitting energy by 2030. In progression toward this, from LEED's existing certifications, the Living Building Challenge (LBC) is currently the most stringent sustainable design protocol.  It sets 20 imperatives that compel building owners, designers, operators and tenants beyond current LEED rating levels.

LEED is a design tool and not a performance measurement tool. It is also not yet climate-specific, although the newest version hopes to partially address this. Because of this, designers may be encouraged to make design choices to gain a LEED point, even though this choice is not optimal for the specific project. Additionally, LEED is not energy-specific; it only measures overall performance, allowing builders to choose how to achieve points under various categories. A USA Today review showed that 7,100 certified commercial building projects targeted cheap and easy green points, such as creating healthy spaces and providing educational displays in the building. Few builders adopted renewable energy because of the initial cost. Builders game the rating system and use certain performances to compensate for the others, and energy conservation becomes the weakest part in the overall evaluation.

LEED has been developed and continuously modified by workers in the green building industry, especially in the ten largest metro areas in the U.S.; however, LEED certified buildings have been slower to penetrate small and middle markets. There has been criticism that the LEED rating system is not sensitive and does not vary enough with regard to local environmental conditions. For instance, a building in Maine would receive the same credit as a building in Arizona for water conservation, though the principle is more important in the latter case. Another complaint is that certification costs could be better used to make the project more sustainable. Many critics have noted that compliance and certification costs have grown faster than staff support from the USGBC.

For existing buildings, LEED has developed LEED-EB. Research has demonstrated that buildings that can achieve LEED-EB equivalencies can generate a tremendous return-on-investment. In a 2008 white paper by the Leonardo Academy comparing LEED-EB buildings vs. data from BOMA's Experience Exchange Report 2007 demonstrated LEED-EB certified buildings achieved superior operating-cost savings in 63% of the buildings surveyed ranging from $4.94 to $15.59 per square foot of floor space. The overall cost of LEED-EB implementation and certification ranged from $0.00 to $6.46 per square foot of floor space, demonstrating that implementation is not expensive, especially in comparison to cost savings.

Incentive programs
Many federal, state, and local governments and school districts have adopted various types of LEED initiatives and incentives. Many local governments have adopted LEED incentive programs, which can include tax credits, tax breaks, density zoning bonuses, reduced fees, priority or expedited permitting, free or reduced-cost technical assistance, grants and low-interest loans.

Cincinnati, Ohio, adopted a measure providing an automatic 100% real property tax exemption of the assessed property value for newly constructed or rehabilitated commercial or residential properties that earn a minimum of LEED Certified. In Nevada, construction materials for a qualifying LEED building are exempt from local taxes. Pieces of construction that are deemed 'inseparable parts', such as concrete or drywall, qualify. Between 2009 and 2014, the state is required to fund half of the required additional cost for public school construction or renovation to attain that standard.

Michigan is considering tax-based incentives for LEED buildings.

In June 2013, USGBC announced a promotion called LEED Earth that refunds LEED certification fees to the first LEED-certified project in a country that doesn't have one.

Notable certifications

The Philip Merrill Environmental Center was the first building to receive a LEED-Platinum rating, version 1.0. It was recognized as one of the "greenest" buildings constructed in the U.S. in 2001 at the time it was built. Sustainability issues ranging from energy use to material selection were given serious consideration throughout design and construction of this facility.

The first LEED platinum-rated building outside the U.S. is the CII Sohrabji Godrej Green Business Centre (CII GBC) in Hyderabad, India, certified in 2003 under LEED version 2.0.

Pittsburgh's   David L. Lawrence Convention Center was the first Gold LEED-certified convention center and largest "green" building in the world when it opened in 2003. It earned Platinum certification in 2012, becoming the only convention center with certifications for both the original building and new construction. 

In Pittsburgh, the visitor's center of Phipps Conservatory & Botanical Gardens received a Silver certification, its Center for Sustainable Landscapes received a Platinum certification and fulfilled the Living Building Challenge for net-zero energy, and its greenhouse facility received Platinum certification. 

Also in Pittsburgh, Sota Construction Services' corporate headquarters, which features a super-efficient thermal envelope using cob walls, a geothermal well, radiant heat flooring, a roof-mounted solar panel array, and daylighting features. It earned a LEED Platinum rating in 2012 with one of the highest scores by percentage of total points earned in any LEED category, making it one of the top ten greenest buildings in the world.

The Cashman Equipment building is the first construction equipment dealership to receive LEED certification. It is the largest LEED industrial complex in Nevada. Caterpillar corporate has rewritten their development guidelines for new facilities based on this building.

Around 2010, the Empire State Building underwent a $550 million renovation, including $120 million towards energy efficiency and eco-friendliness. It received a gold LEED rating in 2011, and at the time was the tallest LEED-certified building in the United States.

The Coastal Maine Botanical Gardens Bosarge Family Education Center, completed in 2011, achieved LEED Platinum certification and became known as "Maine's greenest building".

In October 2011 Apogee Stadium at the University of North Texas became the first newly built stadium in the country to achieve Platinum-level certification.
In May 2012, Soldier Field in Chicago became the first National Football League (NFL) stadium certified LEED. In July 2014, the San Francisco 49ers' Levi's Stadium became the first NFL venue to earn a LEED Gold certification. The Minnesota Vikings' U.S. Bank Stadium equaled this feat with a Gold certification in Building Design and Construction in 2017 as well as a Platinum certification in Operations and Maintenance in 2019, a first for any professional sports stadium.

In September 2012, The Crystal in London became the world's first building awarded LEED Platinum and BREEAM Outstanding status. It generates its own energy using solar power and ground-source heat pumps, and utilizes extensive KNX technologies to automate the building's environmental controls.

When it received LEED Platinum in 2012, Manitoba Hydro Place in downtown Winnipeg was the most energy-efficient office tower in North America and the only office tower in Canada with a Platinum rating. The office tower employs south-facing winter gardens to capture solar energy during the harsh Manitoba winters, and uses glass extensively to maximize natural light.

In San Francisco's Presidio, the Letterman Digital Arts Center earned a Gold certification. It was built almost entirely from the recycled remains of the Letterman Army Hospital, which previously occupied the site.

Torre Sul of Green Tower Brasilias received LEED Gold certification in 2014.

In 2017, Kaiser Permanente, the largest integrated health system in the United States, opened California’s first LEED Platinum certified hospital, the Kaiser Permanente San Diego Medical Center. By 2020, Kaiser Permanente owned 40 LEED certified buildings.
Its construction of LEED buildings was one of multiple initiatives that enabled Kaiser Permanente to report net-zero carbon emissions in 2020.

Criticism

In 2005, Auden Schendler and Randy Udall, respectively a LEED-accredited professional who is the director of environmental affairs at the Aspen Skiing Company and a Colorado-based environmentalist, published an article titled "LEED is Broken; Let's Fix It", in which they criticized numerous aspects of the LEED certification process. They characterized as "costly, slow, brutal, confusing, and unwieldy ... that makes green building more difficult than it needs to be". Schendler and Udall also identify an environmentalist fallacy which they call "LEED brain", in which the public relations value of LEED certification begins to drive the development of buildings. Owen points out that "no bus is as green as an elevator".

Kaid Benfield of the Natural Resources Defense Council estimated that the carbon emissions associated with the additional miles driven were almost three times higher than before, a change from 0.39 metric tons per person per month to 1.08 metric tons of carbon dioxide per person per month. Speck writes that "The carbon saved by the new building's LEED status, if any, will be a small fraction of the carbon wasted by its location".

Both Speck and Owen make the point that a building-centric standard such as LEED, which doesn't sufficiently account for the location in which the building stands, will inevitably undervalue the strong positive effect of people living closer together in cities, which are inherently environmentally efficient, especially when compared to the automobile-oriented sprawl.

LEED standards have also been criticized for not actually creating energy efficient buildings. In 2013, The Washington Examiner analyzed energy efficiency data of New York City buildings and found that LEED-certified buildings actually performed worse than buildings in general. An analysis by USA Today found that building makers target LEED's easiest points – those that don't necessarily increase the energy efficiency of a building.

See also

Building enclosure commissioning
BREEAM
Center for the Built Environment
Center for Environmental Innovation in Roofing
Code for Sustainable Homes
Design Impact Measures
Ecological footprint
Energy conservation
Estidama
Environmental design
Green Globes
High-Performance Green Buildings
Home energy rating
Living Building Challenge
NAHBGreen
Passive house
QSAS
Renewable energy
SmartCode
Sustainable architecture
Sustainable refurbishment
U.S. Green Building Council

Notes and references

Explanatory notes

Citations

General sources 

 Green Building Facts [Data file]. (n.d.). US Green Building Council. Retrieved June 27, 2009.
 Kats, G., Alevantis, L., Berman, A., Mills, E., & Perlman, J. (2003). The Costs and Financial Benefeits of Green Buildings: A Report to California's Sustainable Building Task Force  [Report]. U.S. Green Building Council.
 Lucuik, M., Trusty, W., Larsson, N., & Charette, R. (2005). A Business Case for Green Building in Canada: Presented to Industry Canada  [Report]. U.S. Green Building Council.
 Owen, David (2009) Green Metropolis New York: Arrowhead. 
 Schendler, Auden and Udall, Randy (October 26, 2005) "Leed is Broken; Let's Fix It" Grist
 U.S. Green Building Council. (August 2006). Foundations of the Leadership in Energy and Environmental Design, Environmental Rating System, A Tool for Market Transformation [Policy Manual].

External links

 About LEED at U.S. Green Building Council (USGBC)
 LEED at USGBC
 LEED Project Directory at USGBC
 GBIG Green Building Information Gateway by USGBC
 Going green with LEED by the Canada Green Building Council
 Canada Builds Green Directory at CGBC
 Profile – LEED Green Building Certification System

Building energy rating
Building engineering
Energy in the United States
Environment of the United States
Environmental design
Sustainable building in the United States
Sustainable building rating systems